The Ballindalloch Railway Bridge is a former railway bridge on the crossing the River Spey at Ballindalloch in Moray, Scotland. Built in 1863 as a part of the Strathspey Railway, it was in use until the line was closed in 1968. It is now designated as a Category A listed building, and carries pedestrians and cyclists over the river as a part of the Speyside Way.

Description
The Ballindalloch Railway Bridge crosses the Spey at Ballindaloch, linking the parishes of Inveravon in Banffshire and Knockando in Moray.

History
The Ballindalloch Railway Bridge was constructed in 1863 for the Strathspey Railway. It was designed by Alexander Gibb, an engineer for the Great North of Scotland Railway, and the ironwork was fabricated by G. MacFarlane of Dundee. The Strathspey Railway was absorbed into the Great North of Scotland Railway in 1866, and the bridge was in regular use on the line, carrying passengers and large volumes of whisky from the nearby distilleries, until it was closed to regular passenger traffic in 1965, and closed completely in 1968. The bridge was designated a Category A listed building in 1987, and was a scheduled monument until 2006. It is open to pedestrians and cyclists, forming a part of the Speyside Way.

References 

Listed bridges in Scotland
Category A listed buildings in Moray
Wrought iron bridges